Bagsværd is a middle-class suburb located approximately 12 km northwest of central Copenhagen, in the Gladsaxe Municipality. The town center is recognizable by the Bagsværd Towers, two high-rise apartment blocks. The suburb is connected to the Danish S-Train network through the H and B lines, who service three stations in Bagsværd: Skovbrynet, Bagsværd, and Stengården.

Bagsværd Church, designed by Jørn Utzon, is a contemporary church, known for its rounded interior vaulting and the lighting effects of its skylights.

Established in 1908,the  Bagsværd Boarding School, located in Bagsværd, is one of Denmark's best-known private schools.

Bagsværd houses the headquarters of Danish pharmaceutical company Novo Nordisk and biotechnology company Novozymes.

Notable people 
 Eleonora Zrza (1797 in Bagsværd – 1862) a Danish opera soprano
 Karen Aabye (1904 – 1982 in Bagsværd) a Danish writer, lived in a villa called Kisum Bakke in Bagsværd from 1944
 Hugo Rasmussen (1941 in Bagsværd – 2015) a Danish bassist
 Lotte Koefoed (born 1957 in Bagsværd) a Danish rower and team bronze medallist at the 1984 Summer Olympics
 Hanne Boel (born 1958 in Bagsværd) a Danish singer.
 Thomas Guldborg Christensen (born 1984 in Bagsværd) a retired Danish footballer with 200 club caps
 Nikolas Nartey (born 2000 in Bagsværd) a Danish professional footballer of Ghanaian descent

References

External links

Gladsaxe Kommune - Bagsværds historie 

Cities and towns in the Capital Region of Denmark
Gladsaxe Municipality